So Blu is the debut album by American recording artist Blu Cantrell. It was released by Arista Records on July 31, 2001 in the United States. The album was primarily produced by Chris "Tricky" Stewart, with additional production from Dallas Austin, Jimmy Jam and Terry Lewis, Jason Rome, Don Vito, and Olliewood & Scrilla. It debuted at number eight on the US Billboard 200 chart and spawned the number-two hit "Hit 'Em Up Style (Oops!)". On August 31, 2001, the Recording Industry Association of America (RIAA) certified the album gold, having sold 601,000 copies. The album was also certified gold by the Canadian Recording Industry Association (CRIA) in 2001, having sold 50,000 copies in Canada.

Track listing

Notes
  denotes co-producer

Charts

Weekly charts

Year-end charts

Certifications

Release history

References

2001 debut albums
Albums produced by Dallas Austin
Albums produced by Jimmy Jam and Terry Lewis
Albums produced by Tricky Stewart
Arista Records albums
Blu Cantrell albums